The Aston Martin DBS Superleggera, also sold as the Aston Martin DBS, is a grand touring car produced by British manufacturer Aston Martin since 2018. In June 2018, Aston Martin unveiled the car as a replacement to the Vanquish that is based on the DB11 V12 but featuring modifications that differentiate it from the DB11 lineage. The DBS name was previously used for a model built from 1967 to 1972 and for the DB9-based DBS V12 between 2007 and 2012. In addition, the car also uses the Superleggera name which is a reference to Carrozzeria Touring Superleggera, who helped Aston Martin develop their lightest grand tourers in the 1960s and 1970s.

Design
The front of the DBS features a new front bumper with a large centre grille compared to the DB11 in order for improved engine cooling along with two air extractors on the sides to cool the brakes and two vents on the hood that aid in the engine cooling process. In order to optimise the centre of gravity and weight distribution, the V12 unit has been positioned as low and as far back in the chassis as possible.

The DBS Superleggera features the new ZF 8HP95 transmission with a shorter final-drive ratio of 2.93:1, in contrast to the DB11's 2.70:1. Chassis-wise, it also comes with torque vectoring and a mechanical limited slip differential for more focused track performance. The car also features the same aerodynamics first seen on the DB11 including Aston Martin's innovative Aeroblade system, but refines aerodynamics with an F1-inspired double-diffuser that helps the car generate  of downforce – the highest figure ever for a series production Aston Martin.

Performance
The DBS Superleggera can accelerate from 0– in 3.4 seconds, and 0– in 6.4 seconds. Three driving modes are available: GT, Sport, and Sport Plus which adjust the car's responsiveness.

Variants

DBS Superleggera TAG Heuer Edition
In February 2019, Aston Martin unveiled a DBS Superleggera in partnership with Swiss luxury watch maker TAG Heuer. Production was limited to 50 units worldwide. The bespoke colour is Monaco Black, a metallic black paint with subtle red sparks. It came with full interior and exterior carbon options and satin black 21” alloy wheels, Pirelli P Zero tyres with red stripe and red brake calipers. The interior of the car is composed of bespoke black leather and alcantara quilting with red stitching, only available on this limited edition.
 
Each of the 50 cars came with a limited edition TAG Heuer watch, the DBS Edition Carrera Heuer 02, only available to the buyers of the DBS Superleggera TAG Heuer edition. The dial represents the grille of the DBS and the black and red leather strap reminds the interior of the car.

DBS Volante
A Volante (convertible) model of the DBS was unveiled in April 2019. It has nearly identical performance and the same engine and transmission as the coupé but comes with an eight-layer soft top with eight colour options. For the first time on an Aston Martin automobile, the windshield surround is available in carbon fibre as well as the rear tonneau cover.

DBS Superleggera OHMSS
In May 2019, Aston Martin unveiled a DBS Superleggera to celebrate 50 years of the James Bond film On Her Majesty's Secret Service. The car followed the specification of the original DBS used in the film, with an Olive Green exterior colour and a traditional Aston Martin Grill. Only 50 units were made.

DBS GT Zagato 
In October 2019, Aston Martin revealed the Aston Martin DBS GT Zagato at the Audrain’s Newport Concours in the United States. The car is based on the DBS Superleggera and peak power has been raised from 715 hp to 760 hp. It can only be purchased as part of the £6 million before tax "DBZ Centenary Collection" pack which includes a DB4 GT Zagato continuation as well as a DBS GT Zagato. Only 19 "packs" were available for sale.

DBS Superleggera 007 Edition
The DBS Superleggera 007 Edition was revealed in August 2020. The 007 Edition features Ceramic Grey exterior paint with contrasting black carbon fiber roof, mirror caps, splitter, diffuser, and rear spoiler. It also has gloss black, diamond-turned 21-inch wheels. Production is limited to 25 units.

DBS 770 Ultimate
Aston Martin has revealed its send-off car for the DBS, called the 770 Ultimate. It gets 759 hp from its 5.2-liter V-12 and a handful of visual and mechanical upgrades. Production is limited to just 499 units (300 Coupes and 199 Cabriolets), with every build slot already sold out.

Reception and marketing
Matt Saunders of Autocar rewarded the DBS Superleggera with a perfect five-star score stating, "This is already an outstanding super-GT and represents a rejuvenated British car maker at its absolute best." The DBS made an appearance in the James Bond film No Time to Die.

Gallery

References

Coupés
Rear-wheel-drive vehicles
Front mid-engine, rear-wheel-drive vehicles
2010s cars
Convertibles
Grand tourers
Aston Martin vehicles
Cars introduced in 2018